The Netherlands uses civil law. The role of case law is small in theory, although in practice it is impossible to understand the law in many fields without also taking into account the relevant case law. The Dutch system of law is based on the French Civil Code with influences from Roman Law and traditional Dutch customary law. The new civil law books (which went into force in 1992) were heavily influenced by the German Bürgerliches Gesetzbuch.

The primary law-making body is formed by the Dutch parliament in cooperation with the government, operating jointly to create laws they are commonly referred to as the legislature (Dutch: wetgever). The power to make new laws can be delegated to lower governments or specific organs of the State, but only for a prescribed purpose. A trend in recent years has been for parliament and the government to create "framework laws" and delegate the creation of detailed rules to ministers or lower governments (e.g. a province or municipality).

The Ministry of Justice and Security is the main institution of Dutch law.

Areas of law

The domain of Dutch law is commonly divided in the following areas:
 Administrative law
 Civil law (including family law, inheritance law, contract law and commercial law)
 Criminal law
 Constitutional law (including laws on the structure of the state)
 European law
 International law

Civil law

Civil law is the domain of law that regulates the everyday life of persons and other legal entities (such as corporations).  The main code of Dutch civil law is the Burgerlijk Wetboek.

Nationality law

Criminal law

Criminal law deals with the prosecution and punishment of criminal offenses. The main code is the Wetboek van Strafrecht (nl).

Constitutional law

Constitutional law involves itself with the constitution and the structure of the Netherlands. It involves powers of democratic institutions, the organization of elections and the divisions of powers between central and local governments. See also the article on the Constitution of the Netherlands. Following the practice of many civil law jurisdictions and in contrast to practice in nations such as the United States, the practice of Dutch constitutional law is that judges are not allowed to determine the constitutionality of laws created by the legislature (the government and parliament acting jointly).

Administrative law

Administrative law is the area of law that regulates the operation of the various levels of government and the way persons and legal entities can appeal decisions of the government. The basics of Dutch administrative law were overhauled completely in 1994 with the advent of the new Basic Administrative Law (Dutch: Algemene Wet Bestuursrecht).

European law
European law deals with the influence of laws and regulations of the European Union in the laws of the Netherlands.

See also
 Supreme Court of the Netherlands
 Roman-Dutch Law

External links
 Dutch Ministry of Justice and Security
 Dutch Judiciary and the Supreme Court of the Netherlands

Law of the Netherlands